Manantiales may refer to:

 Manantiales, Argentina, a village in Catamarca Province
 Manantiales, Uruguay, a resort in Maldonado department